Daliang may refer to:

Daliang (大梁), the capital of Wei (state), located near modern Kaifeng, Henan, China
Daliang, a former name of Kaifeng
Daliang Mountains, a mountain range in southwest China between Sichuan and Yunnan
Daliang Subdistrict, in Shunde District, Foshan, Guangdong, China
Daliang Township (大两乡), a township in Wangcang County, Sichuan, China
Daliang, Guangxi (大良), a town in Rong'an County, Guangxi, China
Daliang, Tianjin (大良), a town in Wuqing District, Tianjin, China

See also
Liang dynasty (disambiguation) - many of these states were also known as Daliang ("Great Liang")
Liang (disambiguation)
Dalian, a city in Liaoning, China